The 2008 UEFS Futsal Men's Championship was the eighth UEFS futsal championship held in Belgium, with 8 national teams. The matches were played in Antwerp, Liège, Limbourg, La Louvière and Namur, from March 20 to March 24, 2008.

European Union of Futsal (UEFS) organizes the European Championship biennially.

Teams

Group stage

Group A

Group B

Final stage

Semifinals

5th-8th places

7th-8th places

5th-6th places

3rd-4th places

Final

Final standings

See also
UEFS Futsal Championship
European Union of Futsal

External links
UEFS website
UEFS blog

UEFS Futsal Men's Championship
2008
UEFS
2007–08 in Belgian football